Jai Waetford is the debut EP by Australian singer Jai Waetford. It was released in Australia as a digital download on 6 December 2013. The EP includes the single "Your Eyes". It has peaked to number 21 on the ARIA Albums Chart.

Singles
 "Your Eyes" was released as the lead single from the EP on 1 November 2013. The song has peaked to number six on the ARIA Singles Chart.

Track listing

Chart performance

Weekly charts

Year-end charts

Release history

References

2013 EPs
Jai Waetford albums